Hypotermes winifredi, is a species of termite of the genus Odontotermes. It is native to India and Sri Lanka.

References

External links

Termites
Insects described in 1953
Arthropods of Sri Lanka